Guns Don't Kill People may refer to:
Guns Don't Kill People... Lazers Do, debut album by American band Major Lazer
"Guns Don't Kill People Rappers Do", song by Welsh rap group Goldie Lookin Chain
"Guns don't kill, people do" and its variations, is a slogan popularized by the National Rifle Association of America